3rd Fighter Division may refer to:

3rd Fighter Division (China)
3rd Fighter Division (Germany)